Joe Chaney is an American darts player currently playing mainly in British Darts Organisation events.

Career
In 2017, Chaney reached the Last 80 of the World Masters and Last 32 of the BDO World Trophy. He qualified for the 2018 BDO World Darts Championship as one of the Regional Table Qualifiers and lost to Danny Noppert in the Preliminary Round.

World Championship results

BDO
 2018: Preliminary round (lost to Danny Noppert 0–3)
 2020: Preliminary round (lost to Ben Hazel 2–3)

References

External links
 Joe Chaney's profile and stats on Darts Database

Living people
American darts players
British Darts Organisation players
People from Soddy-Daisy, Tennessee
Year of birth missing (living people)